Darwin LaMar Young (October 20, 1924 – May 29, 2020) was an American politician who served as a member of the Idaho House of Representatives from 1977 to 1981.

Early life 
Young was born in Shelley, Idaho and graduated from Shelley High School.

Career 
He served in the United States Army Air Corps during World War II. Young owned and operated a farm near Blackfoot, Idaho. He served as a member of the Idaho House of Representatives from 1977 to 1981

Death 
Young died in 2020 in Blackfoot, Idaho.

Notes

1924 births
2020 deaths
People from Blackfoot, Idaho
People from Shelley, Idaho
Military personnel from Idaho
Farmers from Idaho
Republican Party members of the Idaho House of Representatives
United States Army Air Forces personnel of World War II